The Mont Blanc tramway or Tramway du Mont-Blanc (TMB) is a mountain railway line in the Haute-Savoie department of France. It is the highest in France and the fourth highest in Europe. It is also the only railway in France reaching over 2,000 metres above sea level.

The extensive views of Mont Blanc and adjacent mountains of the Mont Blanc massif provided by the tramway make it popular with tourists. Also, mountaineers and hikers use the tramway because its stops provide the jumping off points for many trails, as well as giving access to the Refuge Nid d'Aigle close to the terminus of railway. The normal alpine mountaineering route to climb Mont Blanc starts at the tramway's terminus, Nid d'Aigle, and proceeds either to an overnight stop at the Tête Rousse Hut, or at the higher Goûter Hut.

Location
The initial intention was for the line to reach the much higher Aiguille du Goûter. Nevertheless, it remains one of the highest railways in Europe and the second-highest when considering only open-air railways. The Nid d'Aigle and Mont Lachat, the two highest stations of the line, are the only railway stations over 2,000 metres in France. Both are well over the tree line.

Technology
The line has an average gradient of 15% and a maximum gradient of 24%. Some 85% of the line is equipped with rack rail, with adhesion being used at the foot of the line and at intermediate crossing stations. The line is electrified using an overhead line at 11 kV and 50 Hz AC.

Operations
The first section of the line, to the Col de Voza, was opened in 1907. The line reached its current terminus in August 1914 when work was suspended, because of World War I, and never resumed. The line was worked by steam locomotives until it was electrified in 1956.

The line is worked by three motor coaches which are named Anne, Marie and Jeanne. These were the names of the three daughters of the line's owner at the time of electrification.

The journey time is 1 hour from Fayet to Bellevue with four or five trips operating per day.

The Mont Blanc Tramway is featured in the film Malabar Princess.

In late July 2010 the last section of the Tramway and the nearby Nid d'Aigle mountain refuge was closed for safety reasons for the rest of the operational season. This was due to concerns of a repeat of a potentially catastrophic flood from release of a vast quantity of water that had built up within an intraglacial pocket within the Tête Rousse glacier lying directly above it.

 Gallery 

 See also 
Chemin de fer du Montenvers

 References 

Web page https://web.archive.org/web/20060714093545/http://www.compagniedumontblanc.fr/en/tramway/index.html'' and descendants, retrieved on 15 March 2004 at 17:15 UTC.

External links 

Tramway du Mont Blanc website

Tourist attractions in Haute-Savoie
Metre gauge railways in France
Mountain railways
Tram transport in France
Rack railways in France
Railway companies of France
Mont Blanc
Railway lines in Auvergne-Rhône-Alpes
Transport in the Alps